The 1952 Damxung earthquake struck Tibet with moment magnitude of 7.5 in the early morning hours of August 18. The epicenter was located in the Nyenchen Tanglha Mountains in Damxung County, Lhasa Prefecture, Tibet Autonomous Region, People's Republic of China. There was significant damage in Damxung (Dangquka) and nearby Nagqu County.

The earthquake damaged Reting Monastery and 54 people died at Reting (Razheng) and Tangmu.  The total number of fatalities is unknown.

Damxung County suffered another significant earthquake in 2008, further southwest parallel to the Nyenchen Tanglha Mountains.

References

Earthquakes in Tibet
August 1952 events in Asia
1952 earthquakes
1952 in Asia
1952 in Tibet